is a Japanese manga series written by Shinobu Ohtaka and illustrated by Yoshifumi Ohtera. It is a spin-off and a prequel of Magi: The Labyrinth of Magic. It was first serialized in Shogakukan's Weekly Shōnen Sunday from May to June 2013, before being moved to Shogakukan's website Ura Sunday (also later available on MangaONE app) in September of the same year and published until April 2018. Its chapters were collected in nineteen tankōbon volumes.

The manga was adapted into a 5-episode original video animation (OVA) produced by Lay-duce, released from May 2014 to July 2015 bundled with some volumes of the manga. A 13-episode anime television series adaptation, by the same staff from the OVA, was broadcast from April to July 2016.

Plot

Many abnormal things start occurring around the world, with magicians noticing the birth of a certain child. Badr, a war veteran helps his wife Esra successfully birth their child; a future King and the special First-Class Singularity.

Living in the Parthevia Empire with his father Badr and his mother Esra, Sinbad spends his childhood living in discrimination due to the fact that his father avoids going to war against the Reim Empire that all men of Parthevia must go to. Authorities come and take Badr by force, and Sinbad unfortunately loses his father due to the war against the Reim Empire, and spends his youth helping the local villagers and tending to his ill mother. One day, he meets and shelters a mysterious man named Yunan, unaware that he is a Magi. By the request of his mother and learning of his determination to change the world for the better, Yunan decides to guide Sinbad and instructs him to challenge the Dungeon "Baal" that appeared in the border between Partevia and Reim, and whose treasures were still unclaimed as thousands of warriors from both empires had challenged it, but none of them survived, except by Sinbad himself and a Parthevian noble whom he nicknamed "Drakon". After defeating Drakon in battle, Sinbad conquers Baal and gains the allegiance of the Djinn residing there, thus becoming the first ever Dungeon Capturer. Sinbad returns home in time to have one last encounter with his mother at her deathbed and leaves Parthevia to start his own journey to change the world.

Sinbad sets off to sea after an encounter with Cerendine, a general from Parthevia after a brief battle. He throws her into the sea leaving her in a barrel and starts to head toward Imuchakk. After meeting Hinahoho and his sister, and defeating a sea monster with them, he arrives at Imuchakk with the two. Hinahoho was able to get his name, since in Imuchakk the inhabitants are nameless until they pass the coming of age ceremony. As everyone falls asleep at the end of the ceremony, Sinbad is surprise attacked by an assassin of Parthevia’s Sham Lash, Ja’far. After a brief battle, Sinbad fends him off and angers Ja’far, and he retreats. Hinahoho on the other hand, is upset that he took all the credit for Sinbad’s work for defeating the sea monster. As self atonement and a true method of earning his name, he decides to capture the nearby dungeon in Imuchakk; Valefor.

Media

Manga
Magi: Adventure of Sinbad is written by Shinobu Ohtaka and illustrated by Yoshifumi Ohtera. A 70-page prototype manga was released with the first limited Blu-ray released of the Magi: The Labyrinth of Magic anime series. It was later expanded into a serialized manga, which was published in Shogakukan's Weekly Shōnen Sunday from May 18 to June 26, 2013. It was then transferred over to Shogakukan's webcomic site Ura Sunday (also available later on the MangaONE app), being published from September 18, 2013, to April 25, 2018. Shogakukan collected its chapters in nineteen tankōbon volumes, released from September 18, 2013, to July 19, 2018.

Shogakukan Asia published the first four volumes of the manga in English in Southeast Asia from December 2014 to March 2016.

Volume list

Anime
An OVA  produced by Lay-duce was announced in January 2014. The staff of the series was revealed with Yoshikazu Miyao as director, Taku Kishimoto as the series composition, Soichiro Sako will handle character designs. The first episode was released with the manga's third volume on May 16, 2014. The second episode was released with the manga's fourth volume on August 18, 2014. The third episode was released with the fifth volume on December 18, 2014. The fourth episode was released with the manga's sixth volume on April 15, 2015. The fifth and final episode was released with the manga's seventh volume on July 15, 2015.

An anime television series was announced in September 2015 with the same staff from the OVA series. It was scheduled to begin airing on April 15, 2016 in the Animeism programming block, but due to breaking news regarding the Kumamoto earthquake that hit the Kumamoto Prefecture in Japan on April 14, 2016, it was delayed. Instead, it began airing on April 23. The opening theme is "Spotlight" performed by PENGUIN RESEARCH and the ending theme is  "Polaris" performed by Fujifabric.

Episode list

OVA

Anime television series

Notes

References

External links
Manga official website at Ura Sunday 
Anime official website 

2013 manga
2016 anime television series debuts
Adventure anime and manga
Anime series based on manga
Anime spin-offs
Animeism
Aniplex franchises
Comics spin-offs
Fantasy anime and manga
Genies in anime and manga
Lay-duce
Prequel comics
Shogakukan franchises
Shogakukan manga
Shōnen manga

ja:マギ シンドバッドの冒険
zh:魔笛：辛巴德历险记